The Tiber Apollo is an over lifesize marble sculpture of Apollo, a Hadrianic or Antonine Roman marble copy after a bronze Greek original of about 450 BCE. Dredged from the bed of the Tiber in Rome, in making piers for the Ponte Garibaldi  (1885, bridge completed 1888), it is conserved in the Museo Nazionale Romano in Palazzo Massimo alle Terme, Rome. The style of the sculpture reflects the school of Phidias, perhaps the young Phidias himself, as Jiří Frel suggested, and Kenneth Clark observed of it, "If only this figure, instead of the Apollo Belvedere, had been known to Winckelmann,  his insight and beautiful gift of literary re-creation would have been better supported by the sculptural qualities of his subject." Of this marble Brian A. Sparkes reminds us that "the general effect of copies always tends towards sweetness, and so it is here."

The figure, with his girlish curls, may once have held the laurel branch and bow, as he is not a citharoedus. The pensive reserve of such Apollos provided the iconographical type for Hadrianic portrait heads of Antinous in the following century.

Another version of the same type was recovered among the ruins of Cherchel, Algeria, the Roman Caesarea Mauretaniae.

A copy was formerly in the Villa Borghese gardens.

Notes

Roman copies of 5th-century BC Greek sculptures
Sculptures of Apollo